Michael Fellmann (born 20 December 1969) is a German sailor. He competed at the 1996 Summer Olympics, the 2000 Summer Olympics, and the 2004 Summer Olympics.

References

External links
 
 

1969 births
Living people
German male sailors (sport)
Olympic sailors of Germany
Sailors at the 1996 Summer Olympics – Finn
Sailors at the 2000 Summer Olympics – Finn
Sailors at the 2004 Summer Olympics – Finn
Sportspeople from Swabia (Bavaria)
People from Kempten im Allgäu